Jean-Paul Marat (born Mara; 24 May 1743 – 13 July 1793) was a French political theorist, physician, and scientist. A journalist and politician during the French Revolution, he was a vigorous defender of the sans-culottes, a radical voice, and published his views in pamphlets, placards and newspapers. His periodical L'Ami du peuple (Friend of the People) made him an unofficial link with the radical Jacobin group that came to power after June 1793.

His journalism was known for its fierce tone and uncompromising stance toward the new leaders and institutions of the revolution. Responsibility for the September massacres has been attributed to him, given his position of renown at the time, and an alleged paper trail of decisions leading up to the massacres. Others posit the collective mentality that made them possible resulted from circumstances and not from the will of any particular individual. Marat was assassinated by Charlotte Corday, a Girondin sympathizer, while taking a medicinal bath for his debilitating skin condition. Corday was executed four days later for his assassination, on 17 July 1793.

In death, Marat became an icon to the Montagnards faction of the Jacobins as well as the greater sans-culotte population, and a revolutionary martyr; according to contemporary accounts, some even mourned him with a kind of prayer: "O heart of Jesus! O sacred heart of Marat". The most famous painter in Paris, Jacques-Louis David, immortalized Marat in his iconic painting The Death of Marat. David and Marat were part of the Paris Commune leadership anchored in the Cordeliers section, from where the Revolution is said to have started in 1789 because those who stormed the Bastille lived there. Both David and Marat were on the Commune's Committee of General Security during the beginnings of what would become known as the Reign of Terror.

Early life, education, and early writing

Family
 Jean-Paul Marat was born in Boudry, in the Prussian Principality of Neuchâtel (now a canton of Switzerland), on 24 May 1743. He was the first of five children born to Jean Mara (born Juan Salvador Mara; 1704–1783), a Sardinian from Cagliari of Spanish descent, and Louise Cabrol (1724–1782), from Geneva. His father studied in Spain and Sardinia before becoming a Mercedarian monk in 1720, at age 16, but at some point left the order and converted to Calvinism, and in 1740 immigrated to the Protestant Republic of Geneva. His mother, who had Huguenot background from both sides of her family, was the daughter of French perruquier Louis Cabrol, originally from Castres, Languedoc, and Genevan citizen after 1723, and his wife Pauline-Catherine Molinier. Jean Mara and Louise Cabrol married on 19 March 1741 at the parish church of Le Petit-Saconnex, a district of Geneva. One of Marat's brothers, David Mara (born in 1756), was a professor at the Tsarskoye Selo Lyceum in the Russian Empire, where he had Alexander Pushkin as his student.

Marat's family lived in moderate circumstances, as his father was well educated but unable to secure a stable profession. Marat credits his father for instilling in him a love of learning. He explains he felt "exceptionally fortunate to have had the advantage of receiving a very careful education in my paternal home." From his mother, he claims to have been taught a strong sense of morality and social conscience. Marat left home at the age of 16, desiring to seek an education in France. He was aware of the limited opportunities for those seen as outsiders as his highly educated father had been turned down for several college (secondary) teaching posts. In 1754 his family settled in Neuchâtel, capital of the Principality, where Marat's father began working as a tutor.

Education 
Marat received his early education in the city of Neuchâtel and there was a student of Jean-Élie Bertrand, who later founded the Société typographique de Neuchâtel. At 17 years of age he applied for the expedition of Jean-Baptiste Chappe d'Auteroche to Tobolsk to measure the transit of Venus, but was turned down. His first patronage was fulfilled with the wealthy Nairac family in Bordeaux, where he stayed for two years. He then moved to Paris and studied medicine without gaining any formal qualifications. After moving to France, Jean-Paul Mara francized his surname as "Marat".
He worked, informally, as a doctor after moving to London in 1765 due to a fear of being "drawn into dissipation". While there he befriended the Royal Academician artist Angelica Kauffman. His social circle included Italian artists and architects who met in coffee houses around Soho. Highly ambitious, but without patronage or qualifications, he set about inserting himself into the intellectual scene.

Political, philosophical, and medical writing 
Around 1770, Marat moved to Newcastle upon Tyne. His first political work, Chains of Slavery (1774), inspired by the extra-parliamentary activities of the disenfranchised MP and later Mayor of London John Wilkes, was most probably compiled in the central library there. By Marat's own account, while composing it he lived on black coffee for three months and slept two hours a night, and after finishing it he slept soundly for 13 days in a row. He gave it the subtitle, "A work in which the clandestine and villainous attempts of Princes to ruin Liberty are pointed out, and the dreadful scenes of Despotism disclosed". In the work, Marat criticized aspects of England's constitution that he believed to be corrupt or despotic. He condemned the King's power to influence Parliament through bribery and attacked limitations on voting rights. Chains of Slavery's political ideology take clear inspiration from Jean-Jacques Rousseau by attributing the nation's sovereignty to the common people rather than a monarch. He also suggests that the people express sovereignty through representatives who cannot enact legislation without the approval of the people they represent. This work earned him honorary membership of the patriotic societies of Berwick-upon-Tweed, Carlisle and Newcastle. The Newcastle Literary and Philosophical Society Library possesses a copy, and Tyne and Wear Archives Service holds three presented to the various Newcastle guilds.

Marat published "A Philosophical Essay on Man," in 1773 and "Chains of Slavery," in 1774. Voltaire's sharp critique of "De l'Homme" (an augmented translation, published 1775–76), partly in defence of his protégé Helvétius, reinforced Marat's growing sense of a widening gulf between the philosophes, grouped around Voltaire on one hand, and their opponents, loosely grouped around Rousseau on the other.

After a published essay on curing a friend of gleets (gonorrhoea) he secured medical referees for an MD from the University of St Andrews in June 1775.

He published Enquiry into the Nature, Cause, and Cure of a Singular Disease of the Eyes on his return to London. In 1776, Marat moved to Paris after stopping in Geneva to visit his family. 

In Paris, his growing reputation as a highly effective doctor along with the patronage of the Marquis de l'Aubespine (the husband of one of his patients) secured his appointment as physician to the bodyguard of the Comte d'Artois, Louis XVI's youngest brother who was to become king Charles X in 1824. He began this position in June 1777. The position paid 2,000 livres a year plus allowances.

Scientific writing
Marat set up a laboratory in the Marquise de l'Aubespine's house with funds obtained by serving as court doctor among the aristocracy. His method was to describe in detail the meticulous series of experiments he had undertaken on a problem, seeking to explore and then exclude all possible conclusions but the one he reached.

He published works on fire and heat, electricity, and light. He published a summary of his scientific views and discoveries in Découvertes de M. Marat sur le feu, l'électricité et la lumière (English: Mr Marat's Discoveries on Fire, Electricity and Light) in 1779.  He published three more detailed and extensive works that expanded on each of his areas of research.

Recherches Physiques sur le Feu 
The first of Marat's large-scale publications detailing his experiments and drawing conclusions from them was Recherches Physiques sur le Feu (English: Research into the Physics of Fire), which was published in 1780 with the approval of the official censors.

This publication describes 166 experiments conducted to demonstrate that fire was not, as was widely held, a material element but an "igneous fluid." He asked the Academy of Sciences to appraise his work, and it appointed a commission to do so, which reported in April 1779. The report avoided endorsing Marat's conclusions but praised his "new, precise and well-executed experiments, appropriately and ingeniously designed". Marat then published his work, with the claim that the Academy approved of its contents.  Since the Academy had endorsed his methods but said nothing about his conclusions, this claim drew the ire of Antoine Lavoisier, who demanded that the Academy repudiate it.  When the Academy did so, this marked the beginning of worsening relations between Marat and many of its leading members. A number of them, including Lavoisier himself, as well as Condorcet and Laplace took a strong dislike to Marat.  However, Lamarck and Lacépède wrote positively about Marat's experiments and conclusions.

Découvertes sur la Lumière 
In Marat's time, Newton's views on light and colour were regarded almost universally as definitive, yet Marat's explicit purpose in his second major work Découvertes sur la Lumière (Discoveries on Light) was to demonstrate that in certain key areas, Newton was wrong.

The focus of Marat's work was the study of how light bends around objects, and his main argument was that while Newton held that white light was broken down into colours by refraction, the colours were actually caused by diffraction.  When a beam of sunlight shone through an aperture, passed through a prism and projected colour onto a wall, the splitting of the light into colours took place not in the prism, as Newton maintained, but at the edges of the aperture itself. Marat sought to demonstrate that there are only three primary colours, rather than seven as Newton had argued.

Once again, Marat requested the Academy of Sciences review his work, and it set up a commission to do so. Over a period of seven months, from June 1779 to January 1780, Marat performed his experiments in the presence of the commissioners so that they could appraise his methods and conclusions. The drafting of their final report was assigned to Jean-Baptiste Le Roy. The report was finally produced after many delays in May 1780, and consisted of just three short paragraphs. Significantly, the report concluded that "these experiments are so very numerous...[but]...they do not appear to us to prove what the author believes they establish".  The Academy declined to endorse Marat's work. When it was published, Découvertes sur la lumière did not carry the royal approbation. According to the title page, it was printed in London, so either that Marat could not get the official censor to approve it, or he did not want to spend the time and effort to do so.

Recherches Physiques sur L'Électricité 
Marat's third major work, Recherches Physiques sur l'Électricité (English: Research on the Physics of Electricity), outlined 214 experiments. One of his major areas of interest was in electrical attraction and repulsion.  Repulsion, he held, was not a basic force of nature. He addressed a number of other areas of enquiry in his work, concluding with a section on lightning rods which argued that those with pointed ends were more effective than those with blunt ends, and denouncing the idea of "earthquake rods" advocated by Pierre Bertholon de Saint-Lazare. This book was published with the censor's stamp of approval, but Marat did not seek the endorsement of the Academy of Sciences.

In April 1783, he resigned his court appointment and devoted his energies full-time to scientific research. Apart from his major works, during this period Marat published shorter essays on the medical use of electricity (Mémoire sur l'électricité médicale (1783)) and on optics (Notions élémentaires d'optique (1784)). He published a well-received translation of Newton's Opticks (1787), which was still in print until recently, and later a collection of essays on his experimental findings, including a study on the effect of light on soap bubbles in his Mémoires académiques, ou nouvelles découvertes sur la lumière (Academic memoirs, or new discoveries on light, 1788). Benjamin Franklin visited him on several occasions and Goethe described his rejection by the Academy as a glaring example of scientific despotism.

Other pre-Revolutionary writing

In 1780, Marat published his "favourite work," a Plan de législation criminelle. It was a polemic for penal reform which had been entered into a competition announced by the Berne Economic Society in February 1777 and backed by Frederick the Great and Voltaire. Marat was inspired by Rousseau and Cesare Beccaria's "Il libro dei delitti e delle pene".

Marat's entry contained many radical ideas, including the argument that society should provide fundamental natural needs, such as food and shelter, if it expected all its citizens to follow its civil laws, that the king was no more than the "first magistrate" of his people, that there should be a common death penalty regardless of class, and that each town should have a dedicated "avocat des pauvres" and set up independent criminal tribunals with twelve-man juries to ensure a fair trial.

In the early French Revolution

Estates General and Fall of the Bastille 

In 1788, the Assembly of Notables advised Louis XVI to assemble the Estates-General for the first time in 175 years. According to Marat, that in the latter half of 1788, he had been deathly ill. Upon hearing of the King's decision to call together the Estates General, however, he explains that the "news had a powerful effect on me; my illness suddenly broke and my spirits revived". He strongly desired to contribute his ideas to the coming events and subsequently abandoned his career as a scientist and doctor, taking up his pen on behalf of the Third Estate. 

Marat anonymously published his first contribution to the revolution in February 1789, titled Offrande à la Patrie (Offering to the Nation), which touched on some of the same points as the Abbé Sieyès' famous "Qu'est-ce que le Tiers État?" ("What is the Third Estate?"). Marat claimed that this work caused a sensation throughout France, though he likely exaggerated its effect as the pamphlet mostly echoed ideas similar to many other pamphlets and cahiers circulating at the time. This was followed by a "Supplément de l'Offrande" in March, where he was less optimistic, expressing displeasure with the King's Lettres Royales of 24 January. In August 1789, he published La Constitution, ou Projet de déclaration des droits de l'homme et du citoyen, intended to influence the drafting of France's new constitution, then being debated in the National Assembly. In this work, he builds his theories upon ideas taken from Montesquieu and Rousseau, claiming that the sovereignty of the nation rests with the people and emphasizing the need for a separation of powers. He argues for a constitutional monarchy, believing that a republic is ineffective in large nations. Marat's work elicited no response from the National Assembly.

On 14 July, three days after Louis XVI dismissed Jacques Necker as his financial advisor, the people of Paris attacked the Hotel des Invalides and the Bastille, marking the first insurrection of the French Revolution. Marat was not directly involved in the Fall of the Bastille but sought to glorify his role that day by claiming that he had intercepted a group of German soldiers on Pont Neuf. He claims that these soldiers were seeking to crush the revolution in its infancy,  and that he had successfully convinced a crowd to force the soldiers to surrender their weapons. Whether or not this event actually occurred is questionable as there are no other known accounts that confirm Marat's story.

L'Ami du peuple 
On 12 September 1789, Marat began his own newspaper,  entitled Publiciste parisien, before changing its name four days later to L'Ami du peuple ("The People's friend"). From this position, he often attacked the most influential and powerful groups in Paris as conspirators against the Revolution, including the Commune, the Constituent Assembly, the ministers, and the Châtelet. In January 1790, he moved to the radical Cordeliers section, then under the leadership of the lawyer Danton, was nearly arrested for his attacks against Jacques Necker, Louis XVI's popular Finance Minister, and was forced to flee to London. In May, he returned to Paris to continue publication of L'Ami du peuple and briefly ran a second newspaper in June 1790 called Le Junius français named after the notorious English polemicist Junius. Marat faced the problem of counterfeiters distributing falsified versions of L'Ami du peuple. This led him to call for police intervention, which resulted in the suppression of the fraudulent issues, leaving Marat the continuing sole author of L'Ami du peuple.

During this period, Marat made regular attacks on the more conservative revolutionary leaders. In a pamphlet from 26 July 1790, entitled "C'en est fait de nous" ("We're done for!"), he warned against counter-revolutionaries, advising, "five or six hundred heads cut off would have assured your repose, freedom and happiness."

Between 1789 and 1792, Marat was often forced into hiding, sometimes in the Paris sewers, where he almost certainly aggravated his debilitating chronic skin disease (possibly dermatitis herpetiformis). In January 1792, he married the 26-year-old Simone Evrard in a common-law ceremony on his return from exile in London, having previously expressed his love for her. She was the sister-in-law of his typographer, Jean-Antoine Corne, and had lent him money and sheltered him on several occasions.

Marat only emerged publicly on the 10 August insurrection, when the Tuileries Palace was invaded and the royal family forced to shelter within the Legislative Assembly. The spark for this uprising was the Brunswick Manifesto, which called for the crushing of the Revolution and helped to inflame popular outrage in Paris.

Committee on Surveillance

As the Paris Commune of Marat's allies achieved more influence, it formed a Committee on Surveillance which included Marat, Jacque-Nicolas Billaud-Varennes, Jean-Marie Collot d'Herbois, Georges Danton, Jean-Lambert Tallien, Panis (fr) and David. Marat was said by Stanley Loomis to have claimed the position of its head. Ernest Belfort Bax disputed this claim, saying that on appearing once again in the upper daylight of Paris, Marat was almost immediately invited to assist the new governing body with his advice, and had a special tribune assigned to him. Marat was thus assiduous in his attendance at the Commune, although never formally a member. The Commune and the Sections of Paris, between them, had established a Comité de Surveillance, with power to add to its numbers. Into this committee Marat was, according to Bax, co-opted. They quickly decided to round up those they believed were "suspect"; the Committee voted to do so and four thousand were sent into the prisons by late August 1792. Actually the Committee, of which Marat was one of the most influential members, took the step of withdrawing from the prisons those of whose guilt, in its opinion, there was any reasonable doubt. Marat and the rest saw what was coming; the last straw to break the patience of Paris was the acquittal on Friday 31 August of Montmarin, the late Governor of Fontainebleau. Montmarin was notoriously and openly a courtier, who wished to see the allies in Paris, and his royal master reinstated, and who was proved, beyond the shadow of a doubt, to have been actively engaged in plotting to this end; yet, on being brought to trial, he was acquitted, and, as if to lend emphasis to the acquittal, the judge himself, descending from the bench, gave him his arm as he walked out of court.  An unsuccessful attempt was even made to deprive the Commune of its powers. Forty-eight hours later, the notorious September massacres began.

Those arrangements would include a collection of mercenaries grouped as "Marsellais" though they were "foreign vagabonds, dregs of all nations, Genosee, Corsicans and Greeks led by a Pole named Lazowski" Added to these were convicted murderers and those imprisoned for other violent crimes, released in time to join the "Marsellais" at the center of the bloodlettings. At times those enacting violence were joined by mobs of locals, some of who had armed themselves in preparation for a defense of the city National Guardsmen and some fédérés. In some cases makeshift "courts" were set-up, prisoners were pronounced "free" or "guilty" then all were led to a central courtyard where they were bludgeoned, hacked, speared, and decapitated. In other prisons, small bands of mercenaries entered cells which had held murderers days before, who turned their craft on the innocents brought in by the Committee, some as young as 10.

On 3 September, the second day of the massacres, the Committee of Surveillance of the Commune published a circular that called on provincial Patriots to defend Paris and asked that, before leaving their homes, they eliminate counter-revolutionaries. Authored by Marat as head of the Committee, signed by him and circulated to the provinces, it hailed the rounding up and killing of political enemies going on in Paris as a model for the provinces. While Georges Lefebvre maintained collective mentality was sufficient explanation for the mass killing, Stanley Loomis says this "is their excuse or justification".

The Girondins then made a number of copies of this circular, but there is no evidence that it had any effect. Marat himself did not participate in the violence of the massacres, but rather the Sections of Paris had begun to act of themselves. Marat and his Committee of Supervision at most took the control of the movement which had already begun spontaneously. Whether Marat played a part in the cause of the massacres is still continually debated. It can be said that there was a continuous goading on of the tribunals to definite and decided action. In No.679 of L'Ami du Peuple we have the following advice: Guard the King from view, put a price on the heads of the fugitive Capets, arm all the citizens, form a camp near Paris, press forward the sale of the goods of the ‘emigrants,’ and recompense the unfortunates who have taken part in the conquest of the Tuileries, invite the troops of the line to name their officers, guard the provisions, do not miss a word of this last advice, press the judgment of the traitors imprisoned in the Abbaye; ... if the sword of justice do at last but strike conspirators and prevaricators, we shall no longer hear popular executions spoken of, cruel resource which the law of necessity can alone commend to a people reduced to despair, but which the voluntary sleep of the laws always justifies. Danton at the same moment was urging from the tribune the necessity of the prompt appointment of a court to try traitors, as the only alternative to the popular justice of the streets. Maximilien Robespierre, Danton and Marat all stressed the necessity of a tribunal that would judge these crimes. Robespierre intervened on 15 August, as a delegate of the Commune, and proclaimed: "Since 10 August, the just vengeance of the people has not yet been satisfied.“ According to Bax, the September massacres were  the result of the efforts of the Moderate party to screen men who were openly plotting the overthrow of the Revolution. The Moderatist and Girondist Assembly hesitated at making a few examples of even the most notorious of these plotters. The crisis in the war, long foreseen by Marat and others, was now becoming more acute every day. On 6 September, Mlle de Mareuil, daughter of a member of the Commune’s general council, wrote to her brother: I have to make the following remark: since the journée of 10 August, there have only been three people guillotined, and this has revolted the people. Finally people gathered from all sides... Oh my dear friend, we are all in a state of dreadful consternation.There is an exculpatory article in No.12 of Marat’s Journal de la République, occasioned by the virulent attacks of the Girondins in the Convention on the Commune, the Committee of Supervision, and above all on Marat himself, with reference to the massacres:The disastrous events of the 2nd and 3rd of September, which perfidious and venal persons attribute to the Municipality, has been solely promoted by the denial of justice on the part of the Criminal tribunal which whitewashed the conspirator Montmarin, by the protection thus proclaimed to all others conspirators, and by the indignation of the people, fearing to find itself the slave of all the traitors who have for so long abused its misfortunes and its disasters. They call those brigands who massacred the traitors and scoundrels confined in the prisons. If that were so, Pétion would be criminal for having peaceably left brigands to perpetrate their crimes during two consecutive days in all the prisons of Paris. His culpable inaction would be the most serious crime, and he would merit the loss of his head for not having mobilised his whole armed force to oppose them. He will doubtless tell you, in order to exculpate himself, that the armed force would not have obeyed him, and that all Paris was involved, which is indeed a fact. Let us agree, then, that it is an imposture to make brigands responsible for an operation unhappily only too necessary. It is then because the conspirators have escaped the sword of justice that they have fallen under the axe of the people. Is it necessary to say more to refute the dishonest insinuation, which would make the Committee of Supervision of the Commune responsible for these popular executions? But its justification does not end there. We shall see what the principal members of this Committee have done to prevent any innocent person, any debtor, any one culpable of a trivial offence, being involved in the dangers which threatened great criminals. I was at the Committee of Supervision, when the announcement was made that the people had just seized from the hands of the Guard, and put to death, several refractory priests, accused of plotting, destined by the Committee for La Force, and that the people threatened to enter the prisons. At this news, Panis and myself exclaimed together, as if by inspiration, “Save the small delinquents, the poor debtors, those accused of trivial assaults!” The Committee immediately ordered the different jailers to separate these from the serious malefactors and the counter-revolutionary traitors, lest the people should be exposed to the risk of sacrificing some innocent persons. The separation was already made when the prisons were forced, but the precaution was unnecessary, owing to the care taken by the judges appointed by the people, who exercised the functions of tribunes during the expedition, to inquire into each case and to release all those whom the Committee of Supervision had separated. This is a discrimination the despot would certainly not have exercised had he triumphed on the 10th of August. Such are the facts which oppose themselves to the calumny that has distorted the narrative of the events of the 2nd and 3rd of September.The September massacres were not the work of one party, much less of one man, but an ebullition of popular fury, acquiesced in as a necessity by all parties and by all the leading men of the Revolution. This perspective of affairs is summed up in the passages of Mr. Bowen-Graves quoted by Ernest Belfort Bax:Marat’s part in these last terrible events has been constantly and grossly misrepresented. He had long foreseen and foretold what would happen if foreign invasion found Paris in a state of chaos. The predicted crisis had now arrived. On the east the Germans are at the Thermopylae of France. A step more, the Revolution sinks beneath them. On the west the standard of the Vendean insurrection is already raised. Between the two lies Paris, in hardly dormant civil war. Royalty is overthrown, but royalism is rampant. The Swiss guards, the rank and file have fallen, sacrificed to their fidelity to a master who had deserted and forgotten them; but officers, courtiers, chevaliers de poignard, are lively as ever, intriguing, plotting, vapouring in street and café, openly rejoicing in the triumph which German armies will give them measuring, compasses in hand, the distance between Verdun and Paris. The newly-formed tribunal is inefficient, acquitting men, notorious for their part in the intrigues, which were the cause of all the evil. Lafayette, with his army, is believed to be marching on Paris to restore the monarchy. Republicans knew well enough what such restoration would mean. The horrors of Montauban, Arles, and Avignon are written in history, to show how well-founded were their fears. And in the midst of all this came the tidings that the one strong place between Paris and the enemy is besieged; that its resistance is a question hardly even of days. Then, while the tocsin was clanging, and the alarm cannon roaring, and the Girondin minister could find nothing better to suggest, with his unseasonable classicism, than carrying into the South the statue of liberty, Paris answered with one instinct to Danton’s thundering defiance, and perpetrated that tremendous act of self-defence at which we shudder to this day. The reaction hid its head and cowered; and within the month the ragged volunteers of the Republic were hurling back from the passes of the Argonne the finest soldiery which Europe could produce.On 2 September, news arrived in Paris that the army of the Duke of Braunschweig had invaded France and the fortress of Verdun had quickly fallen, and that the Prussians were rapidly advancing towards the capital. This information ignited anger and fear among the population. Parisians knew that an illumination had been staged at the Abbay prison on the day of the capture of Longwy, where behind bars the prisoners insulted passers-by and assured them that the Prussians would occupy Paris and destroy it. That the Parisians' hatred of the Royalists was founded can be deduced from an article published in a Girondist newspaper on 2 September stating that the Royalists decided to burn the city on all sides after the Prussian army entered Paris, starved the city population and punished the revolutionaries. And the Manifesto of the Duke of Braunschweig (25 July 1792), written in large part by Louis XVI's cousin Louis Joseph de Bourbon, Prince of Condé, leader of a large contingent of immigrants in the Allied army, threatened the French people with instant punishment if the people resists the imperial and Prussian armies and the re-establishment of a monarchy. The days of September in Paris were seen by some as the act of self-defense of a people who knew how brutal the counter-revolutionaries were, a people who feared a coup in Paris while fighting on the front lines. After the capture of Verdun, the Prussian army was only a hundred miles from Paris. Many Europeans had no doubt about the victory of the Duke of Braunschweig. A fall of Paris was not expected later than 10 September.

In the Créole patriote for 2 September, the account began by evoking 10 August: 'The people, justly indignant at the crimes committed during the journée of 10 August, made for the prisons. They still feared plots and traitors... The news that Verdun had been taken... provoked their resentment and vengeance.’

It was enough for the Legislative Assembly, at the vigorous request of the Commune, to issue a statement to the French people on 4 September in which it promised "that it would fight with all its powers against the king and the royal government" so that the slaughter would end the same day and Parisians would go to the front. The Battle of Valmy (20 September 1792) was the first victory over their enemy since the beginning of the war. Johann Wolfgang van Goethe, an admirer of the scientific work of Dr. Marat, said, "At that place, on that day, a new era in world history began. It is the first victory of the people over the kings."  No one was prosecuted for the killings.

National Convention

Marat was elected to the National Convention in September 1792 as one of 26 Paris deputies, although he belonged to no party. When France was declared a Republic on 22 September, Marat renamed his L'Ami du peuple as Le Journal de la République française ("Journal of the French Republic").
His stance during the trial of the deposed king Louis XVI was unique. He declared it unfair to accuse Louis of anything before his acceptance of the French Constitution of 1791, and although implacably, he said, believing that the monarch's death would be good for the people, defended Guillaume-Chrétien de Lamoignon de Malesherbes, the King's counsel, as a "sage et respectable vieillard" ("wise and respected old man").

On 21 January 1793, Louis XVI was guillotined, which caused political turmoil. From January to May, Marat fought bitterly with the Girondins, whom he believed to be covert enemies of republicanism. Marat's hatred and suspicion of the Girondins became increasingly heated which led him to call for the use of violent tactics against them. He cried that France needed a chief, "a military Tribune". The Girondins fought back and demanded that Marat be tried before the Revolutionary Tribunal. After trying to avoid arrest for several days, Marat was finally imprisoned. On 24 April, he was brought before the Tribunal on the charges that he had printed in his paper statements calling for widespread murder as well as the suspension of the Convention. Marat decisively defended his actions, stating that he had no evil intentions directed against the Convention. Marat was acquitted of all charges to the celebration of his supporters.

Death

The fall of the Girondins on 2 June, helped by the actions of François Hanriot, the new leader of the National Guard, was one of Marat's last achievements. Forced to retire from the Convention due to his worsening skin disease, he continued to work from home, where he soaked in a medicinal bath. Now that the Montagnards no longer needed his support in the struggle against the Girondins, Robespierre and other leading Montagnards began to separate themselves from him, while the Convention largely ignored his letters.

Marat was in his bathtub on 13 July, when a young woman from Caen, Charlotte Corday, appeared at his flat, claiming to have vital information on the activities of the escaped Girondins who had fled to Normandy. Despite his wife Simone's protests, Marat asked for her to enter and gave her an audience by his bath, over which a board had been laid to serve as a writing desk. Their interview lasted around fifteen minutes. He asked her what was happening in Caen and she explained, reciting a list of the offending deputies. After he had finished writing out the list, Corday claimed that he told her, "Their heads will fall within a fortnight," a statement she later changed at her trial to, "Soon I shall have them all guillotined in Paris." This was unlikely since Marat did not have the power to have anyone guillotined. At that moment, Corday rose from her chair, drawing out from her corset a five-inch kitchen knife, which she had bought earlier that day, and brought it down into Marat's chest, where it pierced just under his right clavicle, opening the brachiocephalic artery, close to the heart. The massive bleeding was fatal within seconds. Slumping backwards, Marat cried out his last words to Simone, "Aidez-moi, ma chère amie!" ("Help me, my beloved!") and died.

Corday was a Girondin sympathizer who came from an impoverished royalist family; her brothers were émigrés who had left to join the exiled royal princes. From her own account, and those of witnesses, it is clear that she had been inspired by Girondin speeches to a hatred of the Montagnards and their excesses, symbolised most powerfully in the character of Marat. The Book of Days claims the motive was to "avenge the death of her friend Barboroux". Marat's assassination contributed to the mounting suspicion which fed the Terror during which thousands of the Jacobins' adversaries – both royalists and Girondins – were executed on charges of treason. Charlotte Corday was guillotined on 17 July 1793 for the murder. During her four-day trial, she testified that she had carried out the assassination alone, saying "I killed one man to save 100,000."

Memory in the Revolution

Marat's assassination led to his apotheosis. The painter Jacques-Louis David, a member of one of the two "Great Committees" (the Committee of General Security), was asked to organise a grand funeral. David was also asked to paint Marat's death, and took up the task of immortalising him in the painting The Death of Marat.  The extreme decomposition of Marat's body made any realistic depiction impossible, and David's work beautified the skin that was discoloured and scabbed from his chronic skin disease in an attempt to create antique virtue. The resulting painting is thus not an accurate representation of Marat's death. As a result of this work, David was later criticised as glorifying the Jacobin's death. 

The entire National Convention attended Marat's funeral, and he was buried under a weeping willow in the garden of the former Club des Cordeliers (former Couvent des Cordeliers). After Marat's death, he was viewed by many as a martyr for the revolution, and was immortalized in various ways to preserve the values he stood for. His heart was embalmed separately and placed in an urn in an altar erected to his memory at the Cordeliers to inspire speeches that were similar in style to Marat's journalism. On his tomb, the inscription on a plaque read, "Unité, Indivisibilité de la République, Liberté, Égalité, Fraternité ou la mort." His remains were transferred to the Panthéon on 21 September 1794 and his near messianic role in the Revolution was confirmed with the elegy: Like Jesus, Marat loved ardently the people, and only them. Like Jesus, Marat hated kings, nobles, priests, rogues and, like Jesus, he never stopped fighting against these plagues of the people. The eulogy was given by the Marquis de Sade, delegate of the Section Piques and an ally of Marat's faction in the National Convention.

On 19 November, the port city of Le Havre-de-Grâce changed its name to Le Havre-de-Marat and then Le Havre-Marat. When the Jacobins started their dechristianisation campaign to set up the Cult of Reason of Hébert and Chaumette and later the Cult of the Supreme Being of the Committee of Public Safety, Marat was made a quasi-saint, and his bust often replaced crucifixes in the former churches of Paris.

After the Thermidorian Reaction, Marat's reputation decreased. On 13 January 1795, Le Havre-Marat became simply Le Havre, the name it bears today. In February, his coffin was removed from the Panthéon and his busts and sculptures were destroyed. The 4 February 1795 (16 Pluviôse) issue of Le Moniteur Universel reported how, two days earlier, "his busts had been knocked off their pedestals in several theatres and that some children had carried one of these busts about the streets, insulting it [before] dumping it in the rue Montmartre sewer to shouts of 'Marat, voilà ton Panthéon !' [Marat, here is your Panthéon] His final resting place is the cemetery of the church of Saint-Étienne-du-Mont.

A bronze sculpture of Marat was removed from Parc des Buttes Chaumont and was melted down during the Nazi occupation of Paris. Another was created in 2013 for the Musée de la Révolution française.

He continued to be held in high regard in the Soviet Union. Marat became a common name, and Marat Fjord in Severnaya Zemlya was named after him. Russian battleship Petropavlovsk was renamed Marat in 1921. A street in the centre of Sevastopol was named after Marat on 3 January 1921, shortly after the Bolsheviks took over the city.

Skin disease
Described during his time as a man "short in stature, deformed in person, and hideous in face," Marat has long been noted for physical irregularities. The nature of Marat's debilitating skin disease, in particular, has been an object of ongoing medical interest. In the 19th century Thomas Carlyle alleged that the cause was syphilis, though this is very unlikely as syphilitic rashes are generally neither itchy nor as long-lasting as Marat's skin condition was. Josef E. Jelinek noted that his skin disease was intensely itchy, blistering, began in the perianal region, and was associated with weight loss leading to emaciation. He was sick with it for the three years prior to his assassination, and spent most of this time in his bathtub. There were various minerals and medicines that were present in his bath while he soaked to help ease the pain caused by the disease. A bandana wrapped around his head was soaked in vinegar to reduce the severity of his discomfort. Jelinek's diagnosis is dermatitis herpetiformis.

Tub
After Marat's death, his wife may have sold his bathtub to her journalist neighbour, as it was included in an inventory of his possessions. The royalist de Saint-Hilaire bought the tub, taking it to Sarzeau, Morbihan in Brittany. His daughter, Capriole de Saint-Hilaire, inherited it when he died in 1805  and she passed it on to the Sarzeau curé when she died in 1862. A journalist for Le Figaro tracked down the tub in 1885. The curé then discovered that selling the tub could earn money for the parish, yet the Musée Carnavalet turned it down because of its lack of provenance as well as its high price. The curé approached Madame Tussaud's waxworks, who agreed to purchase Marat's bathtub for 100,000 francs, but the curé's acceptance was lost in the mail. After rejecting other offers, including one from Phineas Barnum, the curé sold the tub for 5,000 francs to the Musée Grévin, where it remains today. The tub was in the shape of an old-fashioned high-buttoned shoe and had a copper lining.

Works
 A Philosophical Essay on Man (1773) (in English)
 The Chains of Slavery (1774) (in English)
 An Essay on Gleets &c.(1775) (in English)
 Enquiry into the Nature, Cause, and Cure of a Singular Disease of the Eyes (1776) (in English)
 De l'Homme (1776) (translation of his 1773 English work)
 Découvertes de M. Marat sur le feu, l'électricité et la lumière (1779)
 Plan de Législation Criminelle (1780)
 Recherches physiques sur le feu (1780)
 Découvertes de M. Marat sur la lumière, constatées par une suite d'expériences nouvelles (1780)
 Recherches physiques sur l'électricité, &c (1782)
 Mémoire sur l'électricité médicale (1783)
 Notions élémentaires d'optique (1784)
 Lettres de l'observateur Bon Sens à M. de M sur la fatale catastrophe des infortunés Pilatre de Rozier et Ronzain, les aéronautes et l'aérostation (1785)
 Observations de M. l'amateur Avec à M. l'abbé Sans . . . &c., (1785)
 Éloge de Montesquieu (1785) (provincial Academy competition entry first published 1883 by M. de Bresetz)
 Optique de Newton (1787)
 Mémoires académiques (1788)
 Offrande à la Patrie (1789)(pamphlet)
 Constitution, ou projet de déclaration des Droits de l'Homme et du Citoyen (1789) (pamphlet)
 Les Charlatans modernes, ou lettres sur le charlatanisme académique (L'Ami du Peuple, 1791) (pamphlet)
 Les chaînes de l'Esclavage (1792) (translation of his 1774 English work)
 Les Aventures du jeune comte Potowski (unpublished manuscript first published in 1847 by Paul Lacroix)
 Lettres polonaises (unpublished manuscript first printed in English in 1905; recently translated into French but authenticity disputed)
 La Correspondance de Marat (published in 1908 by Charles Vellay)

References

Cited sources

Further reading
 Conner, Clifford D. Jean Paul Marat: Scientist and Revolutionary (2nd ed. 2012) online review from H-FRANCE 2013; excerpt and text search
Fishman, W. J. "Jean-Paul Marat", History Today (1971) 21#5, pp. 329–337; his life before 1789
 Palmer, R.R.  Twelve Who Ruled: The Year of the Terror in the French Revolution (1941) excerpt and text search
 1989–1995: Jean-Paul Marat, Œuvres Politiques (ten volumes 1789–1793 – Text: 6.600 p. – Guide: 2.200 p.)
 2001: Marat en famille – La saga des Mara(t) (2 volumes) – New approach of Marat's family.
 2006: Plume de Marat – Plumes sur Marat (2 volumes) : Bibliography (3.000 references of books and articles of and on Marat)
 The  has been edited with notes by Charles Vellay (1908)
Attribution

External links

 
 
 Marat's (1784) Notions élémentaires d'optique – digital facsimile from the Linda Hall Library
 review of Conner's biography

1743 births
1793 deaths
18th-century French physicians
Alumni of the University of St Andrews
Assassinated French journalists
Assassinated French politicians
Burials at the Panthéon, Paris
Deaths by stabbing in France
French newspaper founders
French radicals
Newspaper publishers (people) of the French Revolution
Newspaper editors of the French Revolution
French people of Italian descent
French people of Spanish descent
French people of Sardinian descent
French people of Swiss descent
Montagnards
People from Boudry
People murdered in Paris
People of the Reign of Terror
Regicides of Louis XVI
English-language writers from France
18th-century French journalists
1793 murders in France